This is a list of crime films released in 1999.

References

1999